Beautiful Mexico (Spanish:México lindo) is a 1938 Mexican musical film directed by Ramón Pereda and starring Pereda, Adriana Lamar and Antonio R. Frausto.

The film's sets were designed by the art director Fernando A. Rivero.

Cast
 Ramón Pereda as Manuel Morales  
 Adriana Lamar as Rosario 
 Antonio R. Frausto as Mamerto  
 Leopoldo Beristáin as Don Chema González  
 Luis G. Barreiro as Licenciado Lángara 
 Juanita Barceló as Polí Ponce 
 Chucha Camacho as Chucha  
 Antonio Bravo as Serafín  
 Conchita Gentil Arcos as Doña Ángeles  
 Fernando Soto as Taxista  
 Trío Calaveras as Ensemble

References

Bibliography 
 Andrew Grant Wood. Agustin Lara: A Cultural Biography. OUP USA, 2014.

External links 
 

1938 films
1938 musical films
Mexican musical films
1930s Spanish-language films
Films directed by Ramón Pereda
Mexican black-and-white films
1930s Mexican films